Eta Cassiopeiae (η Cassiopeiae, abbreviated Eta Cas, η Cas) is a binary star system in the northern constellation of Cassiopeia. Its binary nature was first discovered by William Herschel in August 1779. The two components are designated Eta Cassiopeiae A (officially named Achird , the traditional name for the system) and B.

Nomenclature 

η Cassiopeiae (Latinised to Eta Cassiopeiae) is the system's Bayer designation. The designations of the two constituents as Eta Cassiopeiae A and B derive from the convention used by the Washington Multiplicity Catalog (WMC) for star systems, and adopted by the International Astronomical Union (IAU).

The proper name Achird was apparently first applied to Eta Cassiopeiae in the Skalnate Pleso Atlas of the Heavens published in 1950, but is not known prior to that. Richard Hinckley Allen gives no historical names for the star in his book Star Names: Their Lore and Meaning. In 2016, the IAU organized a Working Group on Star Names (WGSN) to catalog and standardize proper names for stars. The WGSN decided to attribute proper names to individual stars rather than entire multiple systems. It approved the name Achird for the component Eta Cassiopeiae A on 5 September 2017 and it is now so included in the List of IAU-approved Star Names.

In Chinese astronomy, Eta Cassiopeiae is within the Legs mansion, and is part of the  asterism named for a famous charioteer during the Spring and Autumn period. The other components are Beta Cassiopeiae (Caph), Kappa Cassiopeiae, Alpha Cassiopeiae (Schedar) and Lambda Cassiopeiae.

Properties 

Eta Cassiopeiae's two components are orbiting around each other over a period of 480 years. However, the large orbital eccentricity of 0.497 means that their periapsis, or closest approach, is as small as 36 AU, with an apoapsis of about 106 AU. For comparison, the semi-major axis of Neptune is 30 AU.

There are six dimmer optical components listed in the Washington Double Star Catalog. However, none of them are related to the Eta Cassiopeiae system and are in reality more distant stars. The primary has been reported to be a spectroscopic binary, but this has never been confirmed.

Eta Cassiopeiae A has a stellar classification of G0 V, which makes it a G-type main-sequence star like the Sun. It therefore resembles what the Sun might look like were humans to observe it from Eta Cassiopeiae. The star has 97% of the mass of the Sun and 101% of the Sun's radius.

The cooler and dimmer (magnitude 7.51) Eta Cassiopeiae B is of stellar classification K7 V; a K-type main-sequence star. It has only 57% of the mass of the Sun and 66% of the Sun's radius. Smaller stars generate energy more slowly, so this component radiates only 6% of the luminosity of the Sun. Its outer atmosphere has an effective temperature of 4,036 K.

Compared to the Sun, both components show only half the abundance of elements other than hydrogen and helium—what astronomers term their metallicity.

A necessary condition for the existence of a planet in this system are stable zones where the object can remain in orbit for long intervals. For hypothetical planets in a circular orbit around the individual members of this star system, this maximum orbital radius is computed to be 9.5 AU for the primary and 7.1 AU for the secondary. (Note that the orbit of Mars is 1.5 AU from the Sun.) A planet orbiting outside of both stars would need to be at least 235 AU distant.

See also 
 Lists of stars
 List of stars in Cassiopeia

References

External links
 
 

Cassiopeiae, Eta
Binary stars
Cassiopeia (constellation)
G-type main-sequence stars
K-type main-sequence stars
Cassiopeiae, Eta
Cassiopeiae, 24
003821
RS Canum Venaticorum variables
0219
004614
BD+57 0150
0034
Achird